The Garden of Remembrance is a memorial garden in Dublin dedicated to the memory of "all those who gave their lives in the cause of Irish Freedom".  It is located in the northern fifth of the former Rotunda Gardens in Parnell Square, a Georgian square at the northern end of O'Connell Street. The garden was opened by Eamon de Valera during the semicentennial of the Easter Rising in 1966.

Commemoration

The Garden commemorates freedom fighters from various uprisings, including:
 the 1798 rebellion of the Society of United Irishmen
 the 1803 rebellion of Robert Emmet
 the 1848 rebellion of Young Ireland
 the 1867 rising of the Fenian Brotherhood
 the 1916 Easter Rising of the Irish Volunteers and the Irish Citizen Army
 the 1919–21 Irish War of Independence of the Irish Republican Army

The site of the Garden is where the Irish Volunteers were founded in 1913, and where several leaders of the 1916 Rising were held overnight before being taken to Kilmainham Gaol. President Éamon de Valera opened the Garden in 1966 on the fiftieth anniversary of the 1916 Easter Rising, in which he had been a commander.

Design

The Garden was designed by Dáithí Hanly. It is in the form of a sunken cruciform water-feature. Its focal point is a statue of the Children of Lir by Oisín Kelly, symbolising rebirth and resurrection, added in 1971, cast in the Ferdinando Marinelli Artistic Foundry of Florence, Italy.

In 1976, a contest was held to find a poem which could express the appreciation and inspiration of this struggle for freedom. The winner was Dublin born author Liam Mac Uistín, whose poem "We Saw a Vision", an aisling style poem, is written in Irish, French, and English on the stone wall of the monument. The aisling ("vision") form was used in eighteenth-century poems longing for an end to Ireland's miserable condition. 

In Irish the poem reads:

In 2004, it was suggested that as part of the redesign of the square the Garden of Remembrance itself might be redesigned.  This led to the construction of a new entrance on the garden's northern side in 2007.

Queen Elizabeth II laid a wreath in the Garden of Remembrance during her state visit in May 2011, a gesture that was much praised in the Irish media, and which was also attended, upon invitation, by the widow and the daughter of the garden's designer Dáithí Hanly KHS.

References

See also
 Irish National War Memorial Gardens, to Irish soldiers who fought and died in Irish regiments of the Allied armies in World War I

Monuments and memorials in the Republic of Ireland
Buildings and structures in Dublin (city)
1966 establishments in Ireland
1966 in Ireland
Parks in Dublin (city)
Parnell Square